The 2009 Canberra Raiders season was the 28th in the club's history. They competed in the NRL's 2009 Telstra Premiership and finished the regular season 13th (out of 16).

Pre-season

The Canberra Raiders lost founding father Les McIntyre in the pre-season in February leading to the disruption of a pre-season camp and his name being embroidered on the club jerseys for the rest of the season 2009 season.

Season summary

Despite a disappointing start to the season for the Raiders, losing too many close matches, they were able to defeat the Melbourne Storm 26 – 16 at Canberra Stadium (Canberra's first victory over Melbourne in 7 years and 14 games) in round 16, keeping their slim finals hopes alive.
The Raiders in round 21 handed the Brisbane Broncos club the heaviest defeat in their history with a 56–0 trashing at Canberra Stadium, the largest winning margin of the season. The Raiders also had a memorable win over the number one team at the time St George-Illawarra Dragons, by 24–12. Despite wins against three of the top four (St George Illawarra Dragons, Gold Coast Titans and the Melbourne Storm) and coming within three points of the other (Canterbury-Bankstown Bulldogs) losses to bottom placed teams Cronulla Sharks and Sydney Roosters at home saw the Raiders finish in 13th.

Results

Telstra Premiership

Toyota Cup (Under 20s)

The Under 20s team was unsuccessful in defending its National Youth Competition title, the season started well but injuries and players moving up into first grade saw them enter a six match losing streak late in the regular season and saw them just scrape into the top eight on points differential. The team were able to upset the minor premiers Manly in week one of the finals but fell to the Wests Tigers in week two ending their title defence.

Club awards

Squad

Ladders

References

External links
Canberra Raiders: Season Review – NRL.com

Canberra Raiders seasons
Canberra Raiders season